Erickson is a surname. Notable people with the surname include:

Arthur Erickson (1924–2009), Canadian architect
Bernie Erickson (born 1944), American football player
Bill Erickson (1928–1987), American NCAA and National Professional Basketball League player
Carl Erickson (illustrator) (1891–1958), American fashion and advertising illustrator
Charles Telford Erickson (1867–1966), American preacher and founder of a farming school in Albania 
Dennis Erickson (born 1947), American former coach of the National Football League's San Francisco 49ers and Seattle Seahawks
Edwin Erickson (1938-2019), American politician
Ethan Erickson (born 1973), American actor
Hank Erickson (1907–1964), American Major League Baseball catcher for the Cincinnati Reds
Heather Mae Erickson (born 1977), American artist
John Erickson (historian) (1929–2002), British World War II historian
John C. Erickson, American founder of Erickson Retirement Communities
John E. Erickson (Montana politician) (1863–1946), American governor of Montana
John E. Erickson (Wisconsin politician) a former National Basketball Association Milwaukee Bucks general manager and 1970 Republican nominee for the U.S. Senate
John R. Erickson (born 1942), American author
Keith Erickson (born 1944), former American basketball player
Leif Erickson (1911–1986), American actor
LeRoy Erickson (1926 – 1997), North Dakota politician
Louise Erickson (baseball) (1929–2016), All-American Girls Professional Baseball League player
Louise Erickson (actress) (born 1928), American radio and film actress
Matt Erickson (born 1975), American baseball player and coach
Millard Erickson (born 1932), American Evangelical theologian
Milton H. Erickson (1901–1980), American psychiatrist specializing in medical hypnosis
Nick Erickson (1870–1931), American United States Navy Medal of Honor recipient for action in the Spanish–American War
Rica Erickson (1908–2009), Australian author and botanist
Robert Erickson (1917–1997), American composer
Roky Erickson (1947–2019), American musician
Scott Erickson (born 1968), American Major League Baseball pitcher
Steve Erickson (born 1950), American author
Wendell Erickson (1925-2018), American educator and politician

See also
Ericsson (surname)
Erikson
Derrickson

Patronymic surnames
Surnames from given names